Thomas Grantham (1634–1692) was an English General Baptist minister, and theologian. He had access to Charles II of England, and made petitions on behalf of Baptist beliefs.

Early life
Grantham was born at Halton Holegate, near Spilsby, Lincolnshire; by trade he was a farmer. In 1644 a nonconformist congregation had been formed in the South Marsh district, between Spilsby and Boston, Lincolnshire, and one of its tenets was the rejection of sponsors in baptism. Four persons seceded from this congregation in 1651, having become Baptists. Grantham joined them, was baptised at Boston in 1653, and in 1656 was chosen their pastor. He gathered a congregation which met in private houses at Halton and elsewhere, but after considerable opposition he obtained a grant of Northolme Chapel, at Thorpe Northolme, near Wainfleet. Grantham's key convert was John Watts, a man of some property, who had received a university education, and became pastor of a baptist congregation meeting in his own house. By the efforts of Grantham and his evangelists a number of small congregations were formed in the south of Lincolnshire, holding Arminian sentiments, and so distinct from the Calvinistic Particular Baptists.

Under Charles II
Grantham's name is not appended to the original edition (1660) of the Baptist "brief confession". But he seems to have drawn up shortly after the "narrative and complaint", which was signed by 35 General Baptists in Lincolnshire. Grantham and Joseph Wright of Westby were admitted (26 July 1660) to present the "narrative" to Charles II, with a copy of the "brief confession" and a petition for toleration. Thomas Venner's insurrection of Fifth Monarchy Men in January 1661 raised fears of Anabaptist outbreaks. Two addresses to the throne were then drawn up by Lincolnshire Baptists. The second of these was presented (23 February) by Grantham to Charles, who expressed himself as well disposed.

Grantham soon came into conflict with the authorities. Twice in 1662 he was arrested. The first time he was bound over to appear at the next assize at Lincoln; he was again arrested at Boston, his Arminian preaching having led to the rumour of his being a Jesuit. He was thrown into Lincoln gaol, and kept there some fifteen months, till at the spring assize of 1663 he and others were released, pursuant to a petition drawn up by him and presented to the king on 26 December.

In 1666 Grantham became a "messenger," a position originally created by the older Baptists for the supervision of congregations in a district (cf. Robert Everard, Faith and Order, 1649). Grantham developed the office into an itinerant ministry-at-large to "plant" churches. On 7 March 1670 he issued proposals for a public disputation with Robert Wright, formerly a Baptist preacher, who had conformed at Lincoln; but neither Wright nor William Silverton, chaplain to Bishop William Fuller, would respond. Under the Conventicle Act 1670 Grantham was imprisoned again for six months at Louth. Soon after his release he baptised a married woman. The husband threatened him with an action for damages, for having thereby assaulted her. The indulgence of 15 March 1672 did not meet the case of the Lincolnshire Baptists; accordingly Grantham had another interview with the king on their behalf, and obtained an ineffectual promise of redress. He suffered several imprisonments during the remaining years of Charles's reign.

Later life
In 1685 or 1686 Grantham moved to Norwich, where he founded a General Baptist congregation in White Friars Yard. In 1686 he founded a similar congregation in King Street, Great Yarmouth; in 1688 he baptised persons at Warboys in Huntingdonshire; in 1689 he was allowed to preach in the town hall of King's Lynn, and founded a congregation there.

Grantham's closing years were full of controversies with other dissenters in Norwich, especially John Collinges and Martin Fynch. With the established clergy of the city he was on better terms; John Connould, vicar of St. Stephen's, was a good friend, from a theological correspondence. On 6 October 1691 John Willet, rector of Tattershall, Lincolnshire, was brought up before the mayor of Norwich, Thomas Blofield, for slandering Grantham at Yarmouth and Norwich. Willet admitted that there was no foundation for his statement that Grantham had been pilloried at Louth for sheep-stealing. Grantham paid Willet's costs, and kept him out of gaol. He died on Sunday, 17 October 1692, aged 58 years, and was buried just within the west door of St. Stephen's Church. A crowd attended the funeral; the service was read by his friend Connould. Connould was buried in the same grave in May 1703. A long memorial inscription was later placed in his meeting-house, probably by his grandson Grantham Killingworth.

Views
Grantham, as the leading theologian of the General Baptists of the seventeenth century, was an Arminian. Yet he differed from the Anglican Arminians of his day in that he advocated more reformed doctrines of human depravity, the inability in spiritual matters apart from the convicting and prevenient grace of the Holy Spirit, penal substitutionary atonement, and justification by the imputed passive obedience and  active obedience of Christ, as well as a more reformed view of sanctification. Grantham believed in conditional preservation of the saints, which is that salvation could be forfeited only by apostasy from Christ through unbelief. He believed also that it was a condition from which one could not recover. 

Like the other General Baptists, Grantham advocated more interdependence of local congregations in a via media between congregational and connectioning approaches to church polity. These associations had more power than in most later Baptist associations, though the individual congregation was ultimately self-governing and could disagree with the findings of associations and messengers. The stronger view of interconnection between local congregations melded with Grantham's conception of the officer of messenger, to which he was ordained. Messengers were seen as having duties similar to the apostles, yet without the extraordinary gifts and authority of the original apostles. Thus messengers engaged in evangelism, and apologetic activities, advising churches, mentoring and ordaining ministers, helping to resolve congregational conflicts. He advocated the imposition of hands on the newly baptized, believed in anointing with oil for healing (but not in the gift of healing, which was limited to the original apostles), and, like most General and Particular Baptists of his day, believed in the singing of psalmody only by single voices as a part of public worship. 

Grantham also believed strongly in the Baptist doctrine of religious liberty or liberty of conscience, being one of the most prolific authors on the concept in the seventeenth century. His views on Scripture and tradition were similar to those of John Calvin and Balthasar Hubmaier, in that he had a high esteem for the church fathers and quoted them widely yet held to a standard Reformed and Anabaptist sola Scriptura approach to the sufficiency of Scripture. His debates with Anglicans, Presbyterians, Quakers, and Roman Catholics were widely read and quoted in the seventeenth century and evinced his unique Arminian Baptist theology.

Works
Grantham published:

The Prisoner against the Prelate, or a Dialogue between the Common Gaol at Lincoln and the Baptist, n.d. (1662, in verse). 
The Baptist against the Papist, 1663, (dated Lincoln Castle, 10 January 1662, i.e. 1663 (N.S.). 
 The Seventh Day Sabbath Ceased, 1667. 
 A Sigh for Peace: or the Cause of Division Discovered, 1671 (in answer to A Search for Schism). 
 The Baptist against the Quaker, (1673? against Robert Ruckhill and John Whitehead)
 A Religious Contention … a Dispute at Blyton, 1674.
 The Loyal Baptist; or an Apology for the Baptised Believers, 1674; 2nd part, 1684, (answer to Nathaniel Taylor). 
 The Fourth Principle of Christ's Doctrine Vindicated, 1674.
 The Successors of the Apostles, or a Discourse of the Messengers, 1674. 
 The Paedobaptists Apology for the Baptised Churches, (1674?).
 Mr. Horne Answered, or paedo-rantism not from Zion, 1675. Against John Horne.
 The Quæries Examined, or, Fifty anti-queries seriously propounded to the people called Presbyterians, 1676. Against John Barret.
 Christianismus Primitivus, 1678, (four books, each book and each part of bk. ii. separately paged; bk. iv. has separate title-page); it is a collection of treatises, and reprinted a number of the works above.
 An Epistle for Plain Truth and Peace, 1680. 
 A Friendly Epistle to the Bishops and Ministers of the Church of England, 1680. 
 Presumption, No Proof, 1687?. in reply to Samuel Petto. 
 St. Paul's Catechism, 1687; 2nd ed. 1693.
 Hear the Church, an Appeal to the Mother of us all, 1688.
 The Infants' Advocate, 1688; 2nd part, 1689 (against Giles Firmin and Joseph Whiston).
 Truth and Peace: a Friendly Debate concerning Infant Baptism, 1689.
 A Dialogue between the Baptist and the Presbyterian, 1691, against John Collinges; answered by Martin Fynch. It contains lines of verse on Michael Servetus. Grantham apparently had access to the manuscript copy of the Christianismi Restitutio of Servetus, in the library (now at Cambridge) of John Moore. These verses (1691) are an early favourable notice of Servetus in English. 
 The Forerunner to a Further Answer to Two Books, (1691?).
 The Grand Imposter caught in his own Snare, 1691.
 The Dying Words of [Thomas] Grantham, 1691.

Among his unpublished manuscripts were The Baptist's Complaints against the Persecuting Priests, 1685, and Christianitas Restaurata, of which the title seems borrowed from Servetus; both are quoted by Thomas Crosby for their biographical matter. William Richard in 1805 could not gain access to Grantham's manuscripts.

Notes and references

Citations

Further reading
 Clint C. Bass. Thomas Grantham (1633-1692) and General Baptist Theology (Oxford: Centre for Baptist History and Heritage, Regent's Park College, 2013).
 John Inscore Essick. Thomas Grantham: God’s Messenger from Lincolnshire (Mercer University Press; 2013) 246 pages; scholarly biography
 J. Matthew Pinson, "Confessional, Baptist, and Arminian: The General-Free Will Baptist Tradition and the Nicene Faith," in Timothy George, ed., Evangelicals and the Nicene Faith: Reclaiming the Apostolic Witness (Grand Rapids: Baker Academic, 2011).
 J. Matthew Pinson, "The Diversity of Arminian Soteriology," unpublished paper, http://evangelicalarminians.org/the-diversity-of-arminian-soteriology-thomas-grantham-john-goodwin-and-jacobus-arminius/
 J. Matthew Pinson, "Thomas Grantham's Theology of Atonement and Justification," Journal for Baptist Theology and Ministry, Spring 2011. With responses by Clint Bass, James Leonard, and Rhyne Putnam. http://baptistcenter.net/journals/JBTM_8-1_Spring_2011.pdf#page=10
 Adam Taylor, History of the English General Baptists Volume One, nineteenth century, reprinted by Nabu Press.

External links

1634 births
1692 deaths
17th-century Christian clergy
17th-century English clergy
17th-century English theologians
17th-century Protestant theologians
Arminian ministers
Arminian theologians
English Baptist theologians
English Baptist ministers
People from East Lindsey District